San Cono is one of the frazioni of Tripi comune in the Province of Messina, Italy.

Frazioni of the Metropolitan City of Messina